This is a list of vaccine-related topics.

A vaccine is a biological preparation that improves immunity to a particular disease. A vaccine typically contains an agent that resembles a disease-causing microorganism, and is often made from weakened or killed forms of the microbe or its toxins. The agent stimulates the body's immune system to recognize the agent as foreign, destroy it, and "remember" it, so that the immune system can more easily recognize and destroy any of these microorganisms that it later encounters.

Human vaccines

Viral diseases

Bacterial diseases

Vaccines under research

Viral diseases 
 Adenovirus vaccine
 COVID-19 vaccine (Part of today's pandemic since 2019)
 Coxsackie B virus vaccine
 Cytomegalovirus vaccine
 Chikungunya vaccine
 Eastern Equine encephalitis virus vaccine for humans
 Enterovirus 71 vaccine
 Epstein–Barr vaccine
 H5N1 vaccine
 Hepatitis C vaccine
 HIV vaccine
 HTLV-1 T-lymphotropic leukemia vaccine for humans
 Marburg virus disease vaccine
 MERS vaccine
 Nipah virus vaccine
 Norovirus vaccine
 Respiratory syncytial virus vaccine
 SARS vaccine
 West Nile virus vaccine for humans
 Zika fever vaccine

Bacterial diseases 
 Caries vaccine
 Gonorrhea vaccine
 Ehrlichiosis vaccine
 Helicobacter pylori vaccine 
 Leprosy vaccine
 Lyme disease vaccine
 Staphylococcus aureus vaccine
 Streptococcus pyogenes vaccine
 Syphilis vaccine
 Tularemia vaccine
 Yersinia pestis vaccine

Parasitic diseases 
 Chagas disease vaccine
 Hookworm vaccine
 Leishmaniasis vaccine
 Malaria vaccine
 Onchocerciasis river blindness vaccine for humans
 Schistosomiasis vaccine
 Trypanosomiasis vaccine

Non-infectious diseases 
 Alzheimer's disease amyloid protein vaccine
Breast cancer vaccine
Ovarian cancer vaccine
Prostate cancer vaccine
Talimogene laherparepvec (T-VEC), - Herpes virus engineered to produce immune-boosting molecule

Other 
Heroin vaccine

Vaccine components

 Adjuvant
 List of vaccine ingredients
 Preservative
 Thiomersal
 Vaccine types

Vaccine trials
 Vaccine trial

Vaccination strategies
 Pulse vaccination strategy
 Ring vaccination
 Cocooning (immunization)

Vaccine safety

 Adverse effect (medicine)
 Adverse drug reaction
 Artificial induction of immunity
 Eczema vacinatum
 Vaccine Adverse Event Reporting System
 Vaccine injury
 Vaccine Safety Datalink

People

Developers of vaccines

 Leila Denmark
 Grace Eldering
 John Franklin Enders
 Thomas Francis, Jr.
 Ian Frazer
 Sarah Gilbert
 Loney Gordon
 Leonard Hayflick
 Maurice Hilleman
 Edward Jenner
 Pearl Kendrick
 Hilary Koprowski
 Marshall Lightowlers
 Paul Offit
 Louis Pasteur
 Stanley Plotkin
 Albert Sabin
 Jonas Salk
 Max Theiler
 Pablo DT Valenzuela
 Jian Zhou

Organizations, conferences and publications
 Manufacturers

 AstraZeneca
 Bharat Biotech
 BioMérieux
 BioNTech
 CSL Limited
 Crucell
 Eli Lilly
 Emergent BioSolutions
 GlaxoSmithKline
 Intercell
 Johnson & Johnson
 MassBiologics, part of University of Massachusetts Medical School
 MedImmune
 Merck & Co.
 Moderna
 Novartis
 Pfizer
 Sanofi-Aventis
 Sanofi Pasteur
 Serum Institute of India
 Sinopharm
 Schering-Plough
 Sinovac Biotech
 Teva Pharmaceuticals

 Other

 2000 Simpsonwood CDC conference
 American Academy of Pediatrics
 Coalition for Epidemic Preparedness Innovations
 Council of State and Territorial Epidemiologists
 Edward Jenner Institute for Vaccine Research
 Every Child By Two
 Emory University
 Expanded Program on Immunization (Philippines)
 GAVI Alliance
 Immunization Alliance
 International AIDS Vaccine Initiative
 Israel Institute for Biological Research
 March of Dimes
 National Center for Immunization and Respiratory Diseases
 National Immunization Technical Advisory Group (NITAG)
 Advisory Committee on Immunization Practices
 Australian Technical Advisory Group on Immunisation
 Joint Committee on Vaccination and Immunisation
 National Advisory Committee on Immunization
 National Immunisation Advisory Committee
 Standing Committee on Vaccination
 Nature Reviews Immunology
 Nature Reviews Microbiology
 Pasteur Institute
 Rotary International
 Sabin Vaccine Institute
 Strategic Advisory Group of Experts
 Uganda Virus Research Institute
 UNICEF
 Vaccination Week In The Americas
 World Immunization Week
 Yerkes National Primate Research Center

 Advocacy of anti-vaccination opinions

 Generation Rescue
 National Vaccine Information Center
 SafeMinds
 Australian Vaccination-Skeptics Network
 National League for Liberty in Vaccination (France)

Legal aspects

 Project Bioshield Act
 Biodefense and Pandemic Vaccine and Drug Development Act of 2005
 National Childhood Vaccine Injury Act
 Public Readiness and Emergency Preparedness Act
 Vaccine court
 Vaccines for the New Millennium Act

Other

 2001 United Kingdom foot-and-mouth crisis
 Active immunization
 AIDS origins opposed to scientific consensus
 Antibiotic resistance
 Antiviral drug
 BCG disease outbreak in Finland in the 2000s
 Bioterrorism
 Clostridium vaccine
 Controversies in autism
 Death rates in the 20th century
 Efficacy
 Fill and finish
 Flying syringe
 Gamma globulin
 Genetic engineering
 Genetics
 Herd immunity
 History of medicine
 History of science
 Original antigenic sin
 Host (biology)
 Immortality
 Immunization
 Immunology
 Immunostimulant
 Inoculation
 Intramuscular injection
 Jehovah's Witnesses and blood transfusions
 Lipid A
 Live virus reference strain
 Molecular virology
 Naked DNA
 Nobel Prize in Physiology or Medicine
 Number needed to vaccinate
 OPV AIDS hypothesis
 Pet passport
 Pharmacology
 Poliomyelitis eradication
 Post-exposure prophylaxis
 Precautionary principle
 Pregnancy
 Prophylaxis
 Public health
 Quarantine
 Recombinant DNA
 Science and technology in the United States
 Strategic National Stockpile
 Superantigen
 Thiomersal and vaccines
 Timeline of vaccines
 Toxoid
 Travel medicine
 United States and weapons of mass destruction
 Vaccination
 Vaccination policy
 Vaccination schedule
 Vaccinator
 Vaccine
 Vaccine controversies
 Vaccine line jumping
 Vaccine wastage
 Vaccine-induced seropositivity
 Viral shift
 Virology
 Virus-like particle
 World AIDS Vaccine Day

See also

Indian states ranking by vaccination coverage
List of infectious diseases

References

Medical lists
Outlines of health and fitness
Wikipedia outlines